Colina is a Chilean city and commune, capital of the Chacabuco Province, in the northern part of the Santiago Metropolitan Region, approximately 30 kilometers north of Santiago Centro.

Demographics
Of these, 62,811 (80.7%) lived in urban areas and 15,004 (19.3%) in rural areas. The population grew by 47.5% (25,046 persons) between the 1992 and 2002 censuses. Average household income: US$19,783 (PPP, 2006).

Administration
As a commune, Colina is a third-level administrative division of Chile administered by a municipal council, headed by an alcalde who is directly elected every four years. The 2012-2016 alcalde is Mario Olavarría Rodríguez (UDI). The communal council has the following members:
 Gonzalo Torres Ferrari (RN)
 Alejandra Bravo Hidalgo (PRI)
 Andrés Vásquez Medina (PDC)
 Máximo Larraín Geisse (UDI)
 Jorge Boher Ferrada (UDI)
 Pablo Atenas Valenzuela (PDC)

The regional intendant, appointed by the president, is Fernando Echeverría. Belonging to Province of Chacabuco, whose actual governor is Mrs. Angélica Antimán.

Within the electoral divisions of Chile, Colina is represented in the Chamber of Deputies by Mr. Patricio Melero (UDI) and Mr. Gabriel Silber (PDC) as part of the 16th electoral district (together with Lampa, Tiltil, Quilicura and Pudahuel). The commune is represented in the Senate by Guido Girardi Lavín (PPD) and Jovino Novoa Vásquez (UDI) as part of the 7th senatorial constituency (Santiago-West).

Education

The Chamisero campus of the Lycée Antoine-de-Saint-Exupéry de Santiago is in Colina. The campus officially opened on May 21, 2013 although the maternelle (kindergarten) opened in February of that year.

References

External links
   Municipality of Colina

Communes of Chile
Capitals of Chilean provinces
Populated places in Chacabuco Province
1891 establishments in Chile